Trischettn or Treschetten is an historical card game from the South Tyrol for two players. The game is clearly an Austrian variant of Tresette, the major differences being that it is played with a 32-card, German-suited pack rather than a 40-card Italian pack, resulting in a different card ranking, the Tens and Nines becoming the highest rankers in each suit. It also features points for declaring certain combinations such as four Nines. The game is played for 31 points. It used to be one of the three most common card games in South Tyrol, along with Stichwatten and Labbieten, but is threatened with extinction today.

Overview 
Having been one of the three most common card games in South Tyrol, together with Stichwatten and Labbieten, Trischettn is nowadays under threat of dying out. Nevertheless there are moves to revive it by teaching Trischettn alongside other traditional South Tyrolean card games. It is closely related to the Italian game of Tresette, albeit played with different packs and a different card ranking, treschetten being South Tyrolese for 'playing tresette'.<ref>Ammon, Ulrich et al. (2016). Variantenwörterbuch des Deutschen: Die Standardsprache in Österreich, der Schweiz und Deutschland sowie in Liechtenstein, Luxemburg, Ostbelgien und Südtirol. de Gruyter, Berlin/New York, pp. 800/801.</ref>

The game may be played by two to four players. The rules below are for the two-hand game.

 Cards 
Trischettn is played with 32 cards from a Salzburg pattern pack, the Sixes being removed. If an Italian Salzburg (Salisburghesi) pack is used, the Fives are also removed. There are no trumps. Cards rank and score as follows:

Points are scored by collecting the face cards – the Kings, Obers and Unters – as well as the Tens and Nines; each of which scores one third of a point.  An Ace scores one full point. Fractional scores are rounded down. Thus there are 10 (strictly 10⅔ but fractions do not count) points in a pack; with the point for the last trick that makes a total of 11 points available, excluding declarations.

 Playing 
Eight cards are dealt to each player and the rest are placed face down as a talon. The two players must follow suit and a trick is won by the higher card of the led suit. A player unable to follow suit may discard any card. The winner of a trick draws another card from the talon. The opponent then does likewise, before the trick winner leads to the next trick. Once the talon is exhausted, players continue to play tricks from their hands. A variant rule is that players must reveal their drawn cards each time.

 Declarations 
During the game, players may also score bonus points for declaring certain card combinations in their hand as follows:

 Three Tens, Nines or Aces: 3 points
 Four Tens, Nines or Aces: 4 points
 Nappele or Napoli'' (Ten, Nine and Ace) of Hearts, Bells, Leaves or Acorns: 3 points

Players may use cards in more than one declaration e.g. a player may announce three Tens for 3 points and, later, four Tens for an additional point. Declarations may only be made after a player has taken one trick and is 'on lead' to the next trick.

Scoring 
Once the last trick has been decided, players tot up their card points and any points won for declarations or taking the last trick. Any fractions are ignored, hence there are 11 points per deal, excluding any bonuses. Game is usually 31 points; occasionally 41 points. Sometimes the first two games are played for 31 and, if a decider is needed, the 3rd game is played for 41. Sometimes games are played for 31, except the last game of the evening which is played to 41.

Three players 
When three play, 10 cards are dealt to each player and the remaining two are discarded face-down. Discarding face-up is also allowed, but makes the tactics easier. Otherwise the game is the same as for 2 players.

Four players 
When four play, eight cards are dealt to each player. Declarations are only allowed during the first trick and when it is a player's turn. Otherwise the game is same as for 2 players apart from the use of signalling. The following examples assume you are referring to the suit of Bells:
 "I have a Ten": play a Bell in a high arc to the trick
 "I have a Nine": slide a Bell sideways before playing to the trick
 "I have an Ace": tap a Bell on the table, then play it to the trick
 "I'm void": throw your last Bell into the trick; or tap it on the table as you play it to the trick
 "I have 3 or more": pretend to 'sharpen' a Bell against the rest of the cards; or play a 10 then tap the table with your knuckles
 "Play your Ten and follow with another Bell because I have more": play a low Bell and rap the table with your knuckles
 "Throw your Nine on my Ten because I have more Bells": play the Ten and rap the table as before

If your partner signals a high card e.g. a Nine and you want to indicate that you have a low card that you can lead later on for your partner to win the trick, you signal back immediately by playing a card in a large curve across the table (like an exaggerated sign for the Nine).

References 

South Tyrolean card games
German deck card games
Two-player card games
Three-player card games
Four-player card games
Tresette group
Point-trick games
Card games involving signalling